Sa'ed Atshan is a Palestinian anthropologist and professor at Emory University.

Works

Paradoxes of Humanitarianism: The Social Life of Aid in the Palestinian Territories (upcoming)

References

Living people
Palestinian academics
Anthropologists
Emory University faculty
Year of birth missing (living people)